Gagamba (meaning “spider”), subtitled The Spider Man, is a novel by award-winning and most widely translated Filipino author F. Sionil José.  The novel is about a Filipino male cripple nicknamed “Gagamba”, a vendor of sweepstakes tickets in Ermita, Manila. After being buried in the wreckage, the seller survives an earthquake, together with two other fortunate characters, that occurred in the Philippines in the middle of July 1990.  The novel simultaneously raised a “fundamental question” about the meaning of life and offers one “rational answer”.

Description
The whole day, the cripple Gagamba whose real name is Tranquilino Penoy sells sweepstakes at the entrance to the Ermita restaurant called Camarin.  The eating-place became well-known because it was frequented by the so-called “beautiful people” that Gagamba sees daily.  The “beautiful people” includes the “big men” who are politicians, journalists, generals, landlords, and “handsome call-girls”.  During an earthquake that hit the Philippines in July 1990 ,all the dining “beautiful people” at the Camarin were killed and entombed.  The only survivors from the Camarin were Gagamba and two other persons.

References

External links
Gagamba F. Sionil José, a literary review by James Gomez at gomezjames.blogspot.com, December 12, 2009
Francisco Sionil José - A Filipino Odyssey at me.uvic.ca

Novels by F. Sionil José
Political novels
1991 novels
Philippine English-language novels
Novels set in Manila